Federal Realty Investment Trust is a real estate investment trust that invests in shopping centers in the Northeastern United States, the Mid-Atlantic states, California, and South Florida.

Investments
As of December 31, 2021, the company owned interests in 104 shopping centers containing 25.1 million square feet.

Notable properties owned by the company include:

History
In 1962, the company was founded by Samuel J. Gorlitz in Washington, D.C.

In 1999, the company was reorganized as a real estate investment trust in Maryland.

In 2007, founder Samuel J. Gorlitz died.

In 2008, the company acquired Del Mar Village in Boca Raton, Florida for $41.7 million.

In 2012, the company acquired a controlling interest in Montrose Crossing, a property in Rockville, Maryland for $127 million and a controlling interest in a property in El Segundo, California for $183.5 million.

In 2013, the company sold a movie theater in Forest Hills, New York for $20.5 million.

In 2014, the company acquired 2 shopping centers in Monmouth County, New Jersey for $161 million.

In 2015, the company acquired an 85% interest in The Shops at Sunset Place based on a property valuation of $110.2 million.

In 2016, the company was added to the S&P 500 Index.

In 2017, the company acquired a property in Pasadena, California for $29.5 million. The company also acquired Riverpoint Center in Chicago, Illinois for $107 million and 7 properties in Los Angeles County for $345 million.

In 2021, the company acquired a 60% ownership stake in Grossmont Center in La Mesa, California worth $175 million.

References

External links

American companies established in 1962
Real estate companies established in 1962
Financial services companies established in 1962
1962 establishments in Washington, D.C.
Companies based in Rockville, Maryland
Companies listed on the New York Stock Exchange
Real estate investment trusts of the United States